Flaksvatn, formerly Flaksvand, is a village in Birkenes municipality in Agder county, Norway. Located just north of the village of Birkeland on the lake Flakksvann, the village was from 1896 to 1953 the terminus of the Lillesand–Flaksvand Line.

Villages in Agder
Birkenes